The S&P Asia 50 Index is a stock index of Asian stocks that is a part of the S&P Global 1200. The index includes companies listed on the stock exchanges in Hong Kong, South Korea, Singapore, and Taiwan. This index has an exchange-traded fund (ETF) in the United States and in Australia.

Constituents 
As of September 2019, the constituent companies of the S&P Asia 50 Index are:

References

External links
Bloomberg page for SAXCME:IND

S&P Dow Jones Indices
Asian stock market indices